Black Ink Crew: Compton is an American reality television series that premiered on VH1 on August 14, 2019. It is the Compton-based spin-off of Black Ink Crew. It chronicles the daily operations and staff drama at an African American owned and operated tattoo shop, IAM Compton, located in Compton, California.

On January 24, 2022, VH1 announced the show's return for a second season, which premiered on February 21, 2022.

Cast

Main
 KP (born Danny Kirkpatrick), the owner of InkArtMusic (IAM) Compton, a tattoo artist and a rapper
 LeMeir Mitchell, a tattoo artist at IAM Compton
 Vudu Dahl, a tattoo apprentice at IAM Compton
 Ink Drippin' (born Christian Thomas), a tattoo artist at IAM Compton
 Nessie Blaze, former tattoo artist at IAM Compton, now working at Enigma
 Tim Simmons, KP's cousin and the shop manager at IAM Compton
 Barbie (born Erica Thompson), the shop receptionist at IAM Compton

Supporting cast members
 Kyla Pratt, KP's girlfriend, an actress and silent partner in his business
 Danielle Emani, Lemeir's girlfriend and high school sweetheart, a business partner in his food truck business
 Star Divine, KP's business partner and shop manager of IAM Compton
 Katrina Jackson, tattoo artist & owner of Enigma
 Alana, a tattoo artist at IAM Compton

Episodes

Season 1 (2019)

Season 2 (2022)

See also
 List of tattoo TV shows

References

External links
 
 

2010s American reality television series
2020s American reality television series
2019 American television series debuts
English-language television shows
VH1 original programming
Black Ink Crew
Television shows set in Compton, California
Television series set in tattoo shops
American television spin-offs
Reality television spin-offs